Antonie Formanová (born 30 June 1998) is a Czech actress. She starred in Dukla 61.

Biography 

Born in Prague as the youngest of three sisters, Antonie is a daughter of Czech actor  and granddaughter of Miloš Forman and Jiří Stránský (which was a grandson of Czech politician Jan Malypetr).

In 2016, Antonie directed a student film named Martin.
In 2017, she started studying at the Theatre Faculty of the Academy of Performing Arts in Prague, from which she earned a BcA. degree (equivalent to Bachelor of Fine Arts) three years later. In a 2018 TV film , based on a novel by Jiří Stránský, she played the main character's daughter, in fact her own grandmother.

Formanová was awarded the Czech Lion Award for Best Supporting Actress for her role in 2021 film Occupation.

References

External links
 

1998 births
Living people
Actresses from Prague
Czech film actresses
Academy of Performing Arts in Prague alumni
Czech Lion Awards winners
21st-century Czech actresses